Kim Min-sung (born 11 May 2000) is a South Korean footballer currently playing as a midfielder for FK Varnsdorf.

Career statistics

Club
.

Notes

References

2000 births
Living people
South Korean footballers
South Korean expatriate footballers
Association football midfielders
Czech National Football League players
FK Varnsdorf players
South Korean expatriate sportspeople in the Czech Republic
Expatriate footballers in the Czech Republic